VirtualCourthouse.com is an online dispute resolution service that was founded by Judge Arthur Monty M. Ahalt in 2001 in order to provide a less expensive and faster way to resolve legal disputes. Today, disputing parties can choose from a directory listing over 300 neutrals,
ranging from family mediators to construction arbitrators, and retired judges, who can mediate the dispute or render an arbitral award. VirtualCourthouse.com has settled thousands of cases
across the United States.

In 2009, it received the American Bar Association's Louis M. Brown Award for Legal Access for minimizing "the need and cost of unnecessary face-to-face meetings, mailing and copying" during the ADR process.

In 2012, VirtualCourthouse.com entered into partnerships with the video-conferencing provider IOCOM as well as with Auburn University.

See also
Online dispute resolution
Alternative dispute resolution
Mediation
Arbitration

References

External links
 Official website
 Official Blog
 Interview with Judge Ahalt about VirtualCourthouse.com
 Judge Ahalt's personal page

Dispute resolution
Law firms established in 2001
Companies based in Anne Arundel County, Maryland
Internet properties established in 2001
2001 establishments in Maryland